Michiel Pieter Maria Holtackers (born 19 October 1956 in Arnhem) is a former Dutch politician and police officer as well as trade union leader. As a member of the Christian Democratic Appeal (Christen-Democratisch Appèl) he was an MP from 30 June 2011 to 19 September 2012, succeeding Gerda Verburg. He focused on matters of spatial planning, water management and Defense personnel.

Holtackers studied at the Police Academy of the Netherlands in Apeldoorn and criminology at the Belgian Catholic University of Leuven. From 1976 to 2011 he worked in the Dutch law enforcement; his last position was that of chief of the department of international police education of the Dutch Police Academy. From 1997 to 2006 he was also chairman of the Dutch association of middle and higher level police officers.

Holtackers is a member of the Roman Catholic Church.

References 
  Parlement.com biography

1956 births
Living people
Catholic University of Leuven alumni
Chiefs of police
Christian Democratic Appeal politicians
Dutch criminologists
Dutch educators
Dutch police officers
Dutch Roman Catholics
Members of the House of Representatives (Netherlands)
People from Arnhem
Dutch trade union leaders
21st-century Dutch politicians